Dor Daniel born in Hod HaSharon, Israel on August 29, 1982 is an Israeli singer, songwriter and composer.

Career

Songwriting
In 2000, his debut song was "Im Haiti Eloim" (meaning If I Were God) which found some airtime on Israeli radio. He was just 18 at the time. After his military service in the Israeli Defense Forces, Dor Daniel started a songwriting career in earnest with his catchy melodic pop and rock compositions from 2005 to 2008, writing initially for Harel Skaat, who he knew while in the Army. He also wrote for Miri Mesika, a friend of Skaat.

But it was with the song "Ahava ktana"  meaning small love) on Shiri Maimon's debut album that gained him huge fame. It was a song he had written when he was very young and forgot in a drawer alongside tens of other songs he had written. With success of "Ahava ktana", came a contract offer from Helicon Records CEO Roni Baron for a songwriting deal. Encouraged by the success, he wrote for Idan Yaniv, Hila Zaitun, Maya Bouskilla amongst others. He also composed theme song "Time Tunnel" ( for the TV series Mean Girls (ילדות רעות) an adaptation of an American teen comedy film.

Despite earning fame as a writer, Dor Daniel saw himself first and foremost as a performing singer-songwriter and started preparing for his own debut album, but put it on hold briefly after he passed a needed surgery on his vocal cords.

Singing and Compositions
In April 2009 Daniel saw the release of his first album Between Dreams . Daniel wrote and composed all the songs on the album, in cooperation with songwriter Meir Goldberg. The album was greatly expected after the pre-released singles "Makom Letzidech"  (late 2008) and "I wanted to" (early 2009) from the upcoming debut album proved to be very successful, put on Israeli radio playlists and both peaked at number 1 in the weekly Galgalatz charts. With the album Between Dreams, an autobiographical album after his break-up with his long-running girlfriend, the title track was released as a third single, again topping the Israeli charts, and finally "Tomorrow will be fine". With these successes, Dor Daniel won the "Israeli Breakthrough Artist of the Year" by Galgalatz.

In March 2011, he released his follow-up album Ten months, again writing and composing all the songs on the album. "Calling You"  had been pre-released from the album in December 2010 reaching the top of the charts. Shortly before the album was released, another single was released, "I'm all yours".

He cooperated with Idan Yaniv in the latter's album Yes love particularly in the song "Never give up". In 2012, the Israeli Hot 3 station broadcast a docu-reality show Goldstar , a soccer-themed series with Dor Daniel as one of the participants of the football side.

In preparation of his third album he released two pre-releases from the album: "Old North" in April 2013 and "Tmuna Mishtana" .

In 2014, Daniel was chosen to perform the song , for Honor Day , in recognition for the Israeli victims of war. The song was played in official event attended by the Israeli president and at ceremonies in schools and events throughout the country. In 2015, Art Garfunkel performed in Israel and Daniel was chosen to produce a special performance of "The Sounds of Silence" with a host of Israeli singers including Kobi Aflalo, Miki Gavrielov and Sivan Talmor. That same year, he collaborated with singer Shiri Maimon in her song . In 2016, Daniel was in the panel to select the Israeli candidates for the Junior Eurovision competition and co-wrote "Follow My Heart" the Israeli entry to the competition sung by Shir & Tim. Also in 2016, he co-wrote  (pronounce Leat leat meaning "Slowly slowly" for Shlomi Shabat that appeared in the latter's platinum album .

In 2017, he released  (meaning Four years) in preparation for his third album. He has also written a number of scores for ad campaigns notably for Mitsubishi, Hyundai, Tiv Ta'am and arrangements for the Israeli TV dance competition .

Discography

Albums

Singles
(Chart positions in Galgalatz charts)

Filmography
2005: Soundtrack for short Et Effi Dofkim Rak Pa'am Ahat
2012: Goal Star (TV series)

References

External links
Dor Daniel Official Facebook
Facebook

21st-century Israeli male singers
Israeli male singer-songwriters
Living people
People from Hod HaSharon
1982 births